Annals of Transplantation is a quarterly peer-reviewed medical journal that was established in 1996 and is published by International Scientific Information. It is the official publication of the Polish Transplantation Society with the co-operation of the Czech Transplantation Society and the Hungarian Transplantation Society, and covers research on all aspects of organ transplantation.

Abstracting and indexing 
The journal is abstracted and indexed by PubMed/MEDLINE, Scopus, Embase, Science Citation Index Expanded, and Compendex. According to the Journal Citation Reports, the journal has a 2015 impact factor of 1.032.

References

External links 
 

Publications established in 1996
English-language journals
Quarterly journals
Organ transplantation journals